Illya Oleksandrovych Kovalenko (born 20 March 1990) is a Ukrainian professional footballer who plays as a midfielder for Akzhayik.

Career
Kovalenko is a product of the FC Stal Dniprodzerzhynsk academy. He became known during the 2016–17 Ukrainian First League season when he scored 12 goals playing for Obolon-Brovar Kyiv and Desna Chernihiv.

In 2022 he moved to Akzhayik, where he got into the final of the Kazakhstan Cup in 2022.

References

Honours
Akzhayik
 Kazakhstan Cup: Runner-up 2022

Inhulets Petrove
 Ukrainian First League: 2019–20
 Ukrainian Cup Runner up 2018–19

Desna Chernihiv
 Ukrainian First League: 2017–18

External links
 
 
 

1990 births
Living people
Sportspeople from Kherson Oblast
Ukrainian footballers
FC Stal Kamianske players
FC Naftovyk-Ukrnafta Okhtyrka players
FC Kryvbas Kryvyi Rih players
FC Hirnyk Kryvyi Rih players
FC Poltava players
FC Obolon-Brovar Kyiv players
FC Desna Chernihiv players
PFC Sumy players
FC Inhulets Petrove players
FC LNZ Cherkasy players
FK Ekranas players
FC Akzhayik players
Association football midfielders
Ukrainian Premier League players
Ukrainian First League players
Ukrainian Second League players
Kazakhstan Premier League players
Ukrainian expatriate footballers
Expatriate footballers in Lithuania
Ukrainian expatriate sportspeople in Lithuania
Expatriate footballers in Kazakhstan
Ukrainian expatriate sportspeople in Kazakhstan